Oak Grove Township is one of six townships in Durham County, North Carolina, United States. The township had a population of 27,569 according to the 2000 census.

Oak Grove Township occupies  in central Durham County.  The township contains portions of the city of Durham, as well as the unincorporated communities of Gorman and Oak Grove.

Townships in Durham County, North Carolina
Townships in North Carolina